The 1991–92 Algerian Championnat National was the 30th season of the Algerian Championnat National since its establishment in 1962. A total of 16 teams contested the league, with MO Constantine as the defending champions, The Championnat started on October 24, 1991. and ended on October 12, 1992.

Team summaries

Promotion and relegation 
Teams promoted from Algerian Division 2 1991-1992 
 US Chaouia
 WA Mostaganem
 USM Blida

Teams relegated to Algerian Division 2 1992-1993
 ES Guelma
 USM Bel-Abbès
 JSM Tiaret

League table

References

External links
1991–92 Algerian Championnat National

Algerian Championnat National
Championnat National
Algerian Ligue Professionnelle 1 seasons